Michael Chadwick (born April 15, 1995) is an American swimmer who swims for Team Elite Aquatics in San Diego, CA and formerly for the University of Missouri. He is an NCAA All-American and U.S. National Team member.

Career

International Swimming Team 
In fall of 2019, Chadwick signed for the LA Current, in the ISL's inaugural season. In spring 2020, he signed for the Toronto Titans, the first Canadian based team in the ISL.

World Championships 
Chadwick made his international debut at the 2016 FINA World Swimming Championships (25 m), helping multiple U.S. relays win medals. He teamed up with Tom Shields, Lilly King and Kelsi Worrell to win gold in the 4x50-meter mixed medley relay.

Chadwick qualified for the 2017 U.S. World Championships team as a member of the 400-meter freestyle relay. He placed fifth at U.S. Nationals.

On December 11, 2018, Chadwick swam as part of the 4x100 Freestyle relay team for the US in the 14th FINA World Championships. The relay team set a new world record at 3:03.03, demolishing the previous record of 3:03.3 set by USA in 2009.

College career
Chadwick attended the University of Missouri from 2013 to 2017 and swam all four years. At NCAAs his senior year, he finished second in the 100 free with a time of 40.95 and fourth in the 50 free with a time of 18.97. Chadwick finished the most decorated swimmer in the history of the Missouri swimming program with 22 All-American honors.

Early life
Michael Chadwick grew up in Charlotte, North Carolina with his parents David and Marilynn along with his two older siblings, Bethany and David Chadwick. Chadwick attended Charlotte Latin School and trained at the Mecklenburg Aquatic Club.

Chadwick starting swimming at a late age. His father, David Chadwick, played college basketball at the University of North Carolina and his brother, David, played NCAA Division I basketball as well. Undoubtedly, Michael wanted to follow in his father's footsteps. Chadwick played basketball until he was cut from his 7th grade basketball team. The disappointment led him to pursue swimming instead of basketball.

Personal
In March 2017, Chadwick announced his engagement to Cassi Diya following the 2017 NCAA Championships. On December 31, New Year's Eve, 2017 Chadwick and Cassi Diya got married. In October 2020, the Chadwicks announced they were pregnant with a baby boy.

See also
 University of Missouri

References

External links
 
 

1995 births
American male freestyle swimmers
Living people
Medalists at the FINA World Swimming Championships (25 m)
Sportspeople from Charlotte, North Carolina
Swimmers at the 2019 Pan American Games
World Aquatics Championships medalists in swimming
Pan American Games medalists in swimming
Pan American Games gold medalists for the United States
Pan American Games silver medalists for the United States
Pan American Games bronze medalists for the United States
Medalists at the 2019 Pan American Games